Mourne was a constituency of the Parliament of Northern Ireland.

Boundaries
Mourne was a county constituency comprising part of southern County Down, including the Mountains of Mourne. It was created when the House of Commons (Method of Voting and Redistribution of Seats) Act (Northern Ireland) 1929 introduced first-past-the-post elections throughout Northern Ireland. Mourne was created by the division of Down into eight new constituencies. The constituency survived unchanged, returning one Member of Parliament until the Parliament of Northern Ireland was temporarily suspended in 1972, and then formally abolished in 1973.

The seat included the town of Newcastle, the town of Kilkeel (which became an urban district in 1936) and also certain district electoral divisions of the rural districts of Banbridge, Downpatrick, Kilkeel and Newry No. 1.

Politics 
The seat had a small nationalist majority, with Nationalist Party candidates defeating unionists at every election, excepting 1938, when no nationalist stood.

Members of Parliament

Election results 

At the 1938 Northern Ireland general election, Unionist George Panter was elected unopposed.

References

Historic constituencies in County Down
Northern Ireland Parliament constituencies established in 1929
Constituencies of the Northern Ireland Parliament
Northern Ireland Parliament constituencies disestablished in 1973